Roberta Miranda, artistic name of Maria Albuquerque Miranda, from João Pessoa, Paraiba, Brazil is a Brazilian singer.  She is the fourth best-selling female artist in Brazil behind Rita Lee (55 million), Xuxa (33 million) and Maria Bethânia (24.3 million), with 15 million discs sold so far. She got her start in the music industry singing in the clubs of São Paulo, Brazil. Among her greatest successes are A Majestade O Sabiá (The Majesty the Sabiá Bird), Vá Com Deus (Go with God), and Sol da Minha Vida (Sun of My Life) the disc that sold 750,000 copies in the early 1990s.

She has successfully collaborated with other MPB (Musica Popular Brasileira) acts, such as Roberto Carlos, Chitãozinho e Xororó, Fagner, and others. In 2015, she won the 26th Brazilian Music Award in the Best Popular Song Singer category.

Personal life 
In an interview with Tatá Werneck in the late-night talk show Lady Night, from 2018, Roberta declared herself as trisexual.

Discography

References

External links
  
 

21st-century Brazilian women singers
21st-century Brazilian singers
20th-century Brazilian women singers
20th-century Brazilian singers
Living people
1956 births
Women in Latin music
21st-century Brazilian LGBT people
Brazilian LGBT singers
LGBT people in Latin music
20th-century Brazilian LGBT people